This is a summary of notable incidents that have taken place at Shanghai Disney Resort in China. The term incidents refers to major accidents, injuries, deaths, and significant crimes. While these incidents are required to be reported to regulatory authorities for investigation, attraction-related incidents usually fall into one of the following categories:

 Caused by negligence on the guest’s part. This can be refusal to follow specific ride safety instructions, or deliberate intent to break park rules.
 The result of a guest's known or unknown health issues.
 Negligence on the park’s part, either by the ride operator or maintenance.
 Act of God or a generic accident (e.g. slipping and falling) that is not a direct result of an action on anybody's part.

Shanghai Disneyland

Tomorrowland 

 On October 6, 2021, a guest fainted in the queue area of the attraction. He was taken to a hospital, where he later died.

Guest Altercations 
 On February 21, 2021, a 35-year-old guest from Guam attacked and verbally abused a stage performer. The guest was later diagnosed with acute psychosis and hospitalized.

Resort-wide incidents

COVID-19 pandemic 

 On January 24, 2020, the Shanghai Disney Resort (which was the first Disney Resort to close) closed for an undetermined amount of time to help prevent the further spread of coronavirus. The park refunded admission tickets as well as hotel bookings for those guests affected by the closure. The resort partially reopened on March 9, 2020 with the Shanghai Disneyland Hotel, Disneytown, and Wishing Star Park resuming limited operations with new health and safety protocols in place. Disney fully reopened Shanghai Disney Resort on May 11, 2020 with new social distancing guidelines, temperature screenings, and mandatory face masks.

See also 
 Amusement park accidents
 List of incidents at Disney parks

References 

Disney-related lists
Lists of amusement park incidents
Incidents